Elections to Liverpool City Council were held on 1 November 1938. One third of the council seats were up for election, the term of office of each councillor being three years.

Twelve of the forty seats up for election were uncontested.

After the election, the composition of the council was:

Election result

Ward results

* - Councillor seeking re-election

Comparisons are made with the 1935 election results.

Abercromby

Aigburth

Allerton

Anfield

Breckfield

Brunswick

Castle Street

Childwall

Croxteth

Dingle

Edge Hill

Everton

Exchange

Fairfield

Fazakerley

Garston

Granby

Great George

Kensington

Kirkdale

Low Hill

Much Woolton

Netherfield

North Scotland

Old Swan

Prince's Park

Sandhills

St. Anne's

St. Domingo

St. Peter's

Sefton Park East

Sefton Park West

South Scotland

Vauxhall

Walton

Warbreck

Wavertree

Wavertree West

West Derby

Aldermanic elections

Aldermanic Election 9 November 1938

At the meeting of the council on 9 November 1938, the terms of office of nineteen of the aldermen expired and the councillors (but not including the sitting aldermen) elected the following aldermen for a term of six years.

* - re-elected aldermen.

Aldermanic Election 1 February 1939

Following the death  on 27 December 1938 of Alderman Sir James Sexton C.B.E., (Labour, last elected as an alderman on 9 November 1935), in whose place Councillor Bertie Victor Kirby M.P. J.P. (Labour, elected for Edge Hill on 1 November 1936) was elected by the councillors as an alderman on 1 February 1939.

The term of office to expire on 9 November 1941.

Aldermanic Election 3 May 1939

Caused by the death on 10 April 1939 of Alderman George Young Williamson (Conservative, last elected as an alderman on 9 November 1938), in whose place Councillor Robert John Hall (Conservative, elected for Walton on 1 November 1936) was elected by the councillors as an alderman on 3 May 1939.

The term of office to expire on 9 November 1945.

Aldermanic Election 6 September 1939

Following the death on 24 July 1939 of Alderman Frank Campbell Wilson
(Conservative, last elected as an alderman on 9 November 1935), Councillor Gertrude Elizabeth Wilson (Conservative, elected for the Allerton ward on 1 November 1937) was elected by the councillors as an Alderman on 6 September 1939.

The term of office to expire on 9 November 1941.

Aldermanic Election 9 November 1939

Following the death of Alderman Edward Russell-Taylor (Conservative, last elected as an alderman on 9 November 1938), Councillor Edward James Deane (Conservative, elected to the Aigburth ward on 1 November 1936) was elected by the councillors as an alderman on 9 November 1939.

The term of office to expire on 9 November 1944.

Aldermanic Elections 3 April 1940

Following the death, on 19 March 1940, of Alderman John Morris Griffith (Conservative, elected as an alderman on 1 December 1937) Councillor John Case J.P. of "Eversley" Island Road, Harston (Conservative, elected to the Kensington ward on 1 November 1937) was elected as an alderman on 3 April 1940 to fill this vacancy.

The term of office to expire on 9 November 1941.

Following the resignation of Alderman Richard Rutherford, Councillor George Alfred Strong J.P. of "Palmyra" Harthill Road, Liverpool 18 (Conservative, elected to the Allerton ward on 1 November 1936) was elected by the councillors as an alderman on 3 April 1940.

The term of office to expire on 9 November 1941.

Aldermanic Election 3 July 1940

Following the death, on 28 May 1940 of Alderman John George Paris (Conservative, last elected as an alderman on 9 November 1935), Councillor James Graham Reece J.P. of 15 Aigburth Drive (Conservative, elected to the Sefton Park West ward in 1937) was elected by the councillors as an alderman on 3 July 1940

The term of office to expire on 9 November 1941.

Aldermanic Elections 5 February 1941

Following the death, on 18 January 1941, of Alderman Robert Lowry Burns (Conservative, last elected as an alderman on 9 November 1938), Councillor Charles Gordon Snowden Gordon J.P. of 34 Princes Avenue, Liverpool 8 (Conservative, elected to the Fairfield ward on 1 November 1937) was elected by the councillors as an alderman on 5 February 1941
.

The term of office to expire on 9 November 1941.

Following the resignation of Alderman Henry Morley Miller (Conservative, last elected as an alderman on 9 November 1935), Councillor Alexander Critchley, Incorporated Accountant of 454 Aigburth Road, Liverpool 19 (Conservative, elected for the Warbreck ward on 1 November 1937) was elected as an alderman by the councillors on 5 February 1941.

The term of office to expire on 9 November 1941.

Aldermanic Election 7 May 1941

Following the death on 18 April 1941, of Alderman John Wolfe Tone Morrissey (Labour, last elected as an alderman on 6 October 1937), Councillor Joseph Jackson Cleary of 45 Kremlin Drive, Liverpool 13 (Labour, elected for the Garston ward on 1 November 1936) was elected as an alderman by the councillors on 7 May 1941

The term of office to expire on 9 November 1941.

Aldermanic Election 1 September 1943

Following the death, on 30 July 1943, of Alderman Dr.Robert Garnett Sheldon (Conservative, last elected as an alderman on 9 November 1938), Councillor William Greenough Gregson J.P. (Conservative, elected to represent the Fazakerley ward on 1 November 1936) was elected by the councillors as an alderman to fill the vacancy on 1 September 1943

Aldermanic Election 6 October 1943

Following the death, on 13 September 1943, of Alderman Lady Helena Agnes Daltymple Muspratt (Conservative, last elected as an alderman on 9 November 1938), Councillor Ernest Ash Cookson (Conservative, elected to represent the West Derby ward on 1 November 1936) was elected by the councillors as an alderman on 6 October 1943.

Aldermanic Election 27 October 1943

Following the death, on 28 September 1943, of Alderman Edward James Deane (Conservative, elected as an alderman on 6 December 1939), Councillor Moss Greenberg (Conservative, last elected to the Old Swan ward on 1 November 1936) was elected by the councillors as an alderman on 27 October 1943

Aldermanic Elections 9 November 1943

Following the death, on 19 October 1943, of Alderman Herbert Edward Rose (Labour, last elected as an alderman on 9 November 1935), Councillor Patrick Fay (Labour, last elected to represent the North Scotland ward on 1 November 1937) was elected by the councillors as an alderman on 9 November 1943.

Following the resignation of Alderman William Muirhead (Conservative, last elected on 9 November 1935), Councillor Walter Thomas Lancashire J.P. (Conservative, elected to represent the Sefton Park West ward on 1 November 1936) was elected by the councillors as an alderman on 9 November 1943.

Aldermanic Election 5 January 1944

Following the death, on 10 December 1943 of Alderman Thomas Burke (Labour, last elected as an alderman on 9 November 1938), Councillor Peter Kavanagh (Independent, elected unopposed for the Exchange ward on 1 November 1937) was elected by the councillors as an alderman on 5 January 1944.

Aldermanic Election 1 March 1944

Following the resignation of Alderman Arthur Richard Price(Liberal, last elected as an alderman on 9 November 1938), Councillor William John Tristram J.P. (Liberal, elected to represent the Childwall ward on 1 November 1938) was elected by the councillors as an alderman on 1 March 1944

Aldermanic Election 9 November 1944

Following the death on 3 October 1944 of the Lord Mayor, Alderman Austin Harford (Independent last elected as an alderman on 9 November 1938), Councillor James Farrell (Independent, elected for the Exchange ward on 1 November 1936) was elected by the councillors as an alderman on 9 November 1944.

By-elections

No. 18 Edge Hill, 

Following the death on 27 December 1938 of Alderman Sir James Sexton C.B.E. (Labour, last elected as an alderman on 9 November 1935), in whose place Councillor Bertie Victor Kirby M.P. J.P. (Labour, elected for Edge Hill on 1 November 1935), was elected by the councillors as an alderman on 1 February 1939, causing a vacancy for the Edge Hill ward.

No. 8 St. Peter's, 7 February 1939

Caused by the resignation of Councillor Hugh Carr (Labour, elected 1 November 1937).

The term of office to expire on 1 November 1940.

Wartime arrangements

Under the Local Elections and Register of Electors (Temporary Provisions) Acts, 1939, 1940 and 1941 local elections were not held during the Second World War, terms of office of councillors were extended whilst the Acts were in force, and vacancies for councillors were filled by the Council appointing replacements. The Council continued to hold Aldermanic elections as normal.

No.35 Allerton, 29 September 1939

Caused by Councillor Gertrude Elizabeth Wilson (Conservative, elected for the Allerton ward on 1 November 1937) being elected by the councillors as an alderman on 6 September 1939, following the death on 24 July 1939 of Alderman Frank Campbell Wilson
(Conservative, last elected as an alderman on 9 November 1935)

The term of office to expire on 1 November 1941.

No.25 Walton, 9 November 1939

Caused by Councillor Robert John Hall (Conservative, elected for Walton on 1 November 1936) being elected by the councillors as an alderman on 3 May 1939, following the death on 10 April 1939 of Alderman George Young Williamson (Conservative, last elected as an alderman on 9 November 1939).

Richard Edward Searle (Conservative) was appointed by the Council as a councillor for the Walton ward on 9 November 1939.

No. 26 Warbreck, 9 November 1939

Following the death on 1 November 1939 of Councillor Hugh Wagstaff (Conservative, elected for Warbreck on 25 July 1939.

Herbert William Metcalf (Conservative) was appointed by the Council as Councillor for the Warbreck ward on 9 November 1939.

No. 40 Croxteth, 9 November 1939

William Henry Barton (Labour) was appointed by the Council as Councillor for the Croxteth ward on 9 November 1939.

No. 17 Aigburth, 6 December 1939

Following the death of Alderman Edward Russell-Taylor (Conservative, last elected as an alderman on 9 November 1938), Councillor Edward James Deane (Conservative, elected to the Aigburth ward on 1 November 1936) was elected by the councillors as an alderman on 9 November 1939.

Herbert Mylrea Allen was appointed by the Council as Councillor for the Aigburth ward on 6 December 1939.

No. 19 Kensington 1 May 1940

Alderman John Morris Griffith (Conservative, elected as an alderman on 1 December 1937) died on 19 March 1940. In his place, Councillor John Case (Conservative, elected to the Kensington ward on 1 November 1937) was elected as an alderman on 3 April 1940 to fill this vacancy.

Stephen Minion was appointed by the Council as Councillor for the Kensington ward on 1 May 1940.

No. 35 Allerton, 1 May 1940

Following the resignation of Alderman Richard Rutherford, Councillor George Alfred Strong (Conservative, elected to the Allerton ward on 1 November 1936) was elected by the councillors as an alderman on 3 April 1940.

Robert Henry Gregory was appointed by the Council as Councillor for the Allerton ward on 1 May 1940.

No. 16 Sefton Park West, 4 September 1940

Following the death, on 28 May 1940 of Alderman John George Paris (Conservative, last elected as an alderman on 9 November 1935), Councillor James Graham Reece (Conservative, elected to the Sefton Park West ward in 1937) was elected by the councillors as an alderman on 4 September 1940.

No. 22 Netherfield, 9 November 1940

George Edward Lewis was appointed by the Council as Councillor for the Netherfield ward on 9 November 1940.

No. 15 Sefton Park East, 4 December 1940

Arthur Maiden (Conservative)  was appointed by the Council as Councillor for the Sefton Park East ward on 4 December 1940.

No. 10 Great George, 4 December 1940

Councillor Joseph Campbell (Labour, elected for the Great George ward on 1 November 1936) having not attended any meetings of the City Council was disqualified as councillor under sections 63 and 64 of the Local Government Act 1933 on 9 November 1940.

Robert Edward Cottier (Labour) was appointed by the Council as Councillor for the Great George ward on 4 December 1940.

No. 31 Fairfield, 5 March 1941

Following the death, in January 1941, of Alderman Robert Lowry Burns (Conservative, last elected as an alderman on 9 November 1938), Councillor Charles Gordon Snowden Gordon (Conservative, elected to the Fairfield ward on 1 November 1937) was elected by the councillors as an alderman on 5 February 1941.

Charles Tillston was appointed by the Council as Councillor for the Fairfield ward on 5 March 1941.

No. 26 Warbreck, 5 March 1941

Following the resignation of Alderman Henry Morley Miller (Conservative, last elected as an alderman on 9 November 1935), Councillor Alexander Critchley (Conservative, elected for the Warbreck ward on 1 November 1937) was elected as an alderman by the councillors on 5 February 1941.

John Green was appointed by the Council as Councillor for the Warbreck ward on 5 March 1941.

No. 14 Brunswick, 7 May 1941

Andrew Bennett was appointed by the Council as Councillor for the Brunswick ward on 7 May 1941.

No. 37 Garston, 4 June 1941

Following the death of Alderman John Wolfe Tone Morrissey (Labour, last elected as an alderman on 6 October 1937), Councillor Joseph Jackson Cleary (Labour, elected for the Garston ward on 1 November 1936) was elected as an alderman by the councillors on 7 May 1941.

Alfred Demain was appointed by the Council as Councillor for the Garston ward on 7 May 1941.

No. 11 Brunswick, 2 July 1941

Caused by the death  on 28 May 1941 of Councillor Thomas Hanley (Labour, last elected for the Brunswick ward on 1 November 1936).

Frank H. Cain was appointed by the Council as Councillor for the Brunswick ward on 2 July 1941.

No. 10 Great George, 3 February 1942

John David Towers was appointed by the Council as Councillor for the Great George ward on 3 February 1942.

No. 13 Prince's Park, 3 March 1942

Charles Cowlin  was appointed by the Council as Councillor for the Prince's Park ward on 3 March 1942.

No. 32 Old Swan 

Following the death, on 28 September 1943, of Alderman Edward James Deane (Conservative, elected as an alderman on 6 December 1939), Councillor Moss Greenberg (Conservative, last elected to the Old Swan ward on 1 November 1936) was elected by the councillors as an alderman on 27 October 1943.

No. 27 Fazakerley, 6 October 1943

Following the death, on 30 July 1943, of Alderman Dr.Robert Garnett Sheldon (Conservative, last elected as an alderman on 9 November 1938), Councillor William Greenough Gregson J.P. (Conservative, elected to represent the Fazakerley ward on 1 November 1936) was elected by the councillors as an alderman to fill the vacancy on 1 September 1943

Robert Alexander Smith was appointed by the Council as Councillor for the Fazakerley ward on 6 October 1943.

No. 28 West Derby, 27 October 1943

Following the death, on 13 September 1943, of Alderman Lady Helena Agnes Daltymple Muspratt (Conservative, last elected as an alderman on 9 November 1938), Councillor Ernest Ash Cookson (Conservative, elected to represent the West Derby ward on 1 November 1936) was elected by the councillors as an alderman on 6 October 1943.

Robert Cyril Beattie was appointed by the Council as Councillor for the West Derby ward on 27 October 1943.

No. 32 Old Swan, 9 November 1943

Ernest Walker was appointed by the Council as Councillor for the Old Swan ward on 9 November 1943.

No. 2 North Scotland, 1 December 1943

Following the death, on 19 October 1943, of Alderman Herbert Edward Rose (Labour, last elected as an alderman on 9 November 1935), Councillor Patrick Fay (Labour, last elected to represent the North Scotland ward on 1 November 1937) was elected by the councillors as an alderman on 9 November 1943.

Thomas Fay was appointed by the Council as Councillor for the North Scotland ward on 9 November 1943.

No. 16 Sefton Park West, 2 February 1944

Following the resignation of Alderman William Muirhead (Conservative, last elected on 9 November 1935), Councillor Walter Thomas Lancashire J.P. (Conservative, elected to represent the Sefton Park West ward on 1 November 1936) was elected by the councillors as an alderman on 9 November 1943.

Arthur Brierley Collins was appointed by the Council as Councillor for the Sefton Park West ward on 2 February 1944.

No. 5 Exchange, 2 February 1944

Following the death, on 10 December 1943 of Alderman Thomas Burke (Labour, last elected as an alderman on 9 November 1938), Councillor Peter Kavanagh (Independent, elected unopposed for the Exchange ward on 1 November 1937) was elected by the councillors as an alderman on 5 January 1944.

Herbert Francis Granby was appointed by the Council as Councillor for the Exchange ward on 2 February 1944.

No. 38 Childwall, 5 April 1944

Following the resignation of Alderman Arthur Richard Price(Liberal, last elected as an alderman on 9 November 1938), Councillor William John Tristram J.P. (Liberal, elected to represent the Childwall ward on 1 November 1938) was elected by the councillors as an alderman on 1 March 1944.

John Richard Jones J.P. was appointed by the Council as Councillor for the Childwall ward on 5 April 1944.

No. 8 St. Peter's, 3 May 1944

William Henry Ledsom was appointed by the Council as Councillor for the St. Peter's ward on 3 May 1944.

No. 4 Vauxhall, 5 July 1944

Following the death of Councillor Joseph Leo Jones (??) on 9 May 1944 (Labour, elected unopposed for the Vauxhall ward on 1 November 1938), Joseph Cyril Brady was appointed by the Council as Councillor for the Vauxhall ward on 5 July 1944.

No. 20 Low Hill, 5 July 1944

William John Acheson was appointed by the Council as Councillor for the Low Hill ward on 5 July 1944.

No. 31 Fairfield, 26 July 1944

Charles Frederick Elias was appointed by the Council as Councillor for the Fairfield ward on 26 July 1944.

No. 5 Exchange, 6 December 1944

Following the death on 3 October 1944 of the Lord Mayor, Alderman Austin Harford (Independent last elected as an alderman on 9 November 1938), Councillor James Farrell (Independent, elected for the Exchange ward on 1 November 1936) was elected by the councillors as an alderman on 9 November 1944.

Leo Henry Wright J.P. was appointed by the Council as Councillor for the Exchange ward on 6 December 1944.

No. 20 Low Hill, 2 May 1945

Following the death of Councillor William John Acheson (appointed 5 July 1944) on 15 March 1945, George Moore was appointed by the Council as Councillor for the Low Hill ward on 2 May 1945.

No. 34 Wavertree, 

Following the death on 25 August 1945 of Alderman Joseph Belger (Independent, last elected as an alderman on 9  November 1935), Councillor Alfred Levy (Conservative, Wavertree West 1936) was elected by the councillors as an alderman on 3 October 1945.

See also

 Liverpool City Council
 Liverpool Town Council elections 1835 - 1879
 Liverpool City Council elections 1880–present
 Mayors and Lord Mayors of Liverpool 1207 to present
 History of local government in England

References

1938
1938 English local elections
1930s in Liverpool